p-Menthane-3,8-diol, also known as para-menthane-3,8-diol, PMD, or menthoglycol, is an organic compound classified as a diol and a terpenoid. It is colorless.  Its name reflects the hydrocarbon backbone, which is that of p-menthane. A total of eight stereoisomers are possible, based on the three stereocenters of the ring. Depending on the source, one or more may predominate.

Use as insect repellent
p-Menthane-3,8-diol is the active ingredient in some insect repellents. Its odor and chemical structure are similar to menthol and has a cooling feel.  Its repellent effect was discovered in the 1960s by the industry. There are eight possible stereoisomers of PMD; the exact composition is rarely specified and is commonly assumed to be a complex mixture.

PMD is found in small quantities in the essential oil from the leaves of Corymbia citriodora, formerly known as Eucalyptus citriodora. This tree is native to Australia, but is now cultivated in many warm places around the world.

C. citriodora oil, when refined to increase its PMD content for use in insect repellents, is known in the United States as oil of lemon eucalyptus (OLE). Some commercial PMD products are not made from C. citriodora oil, but rather from synthetic citronellal.

Refined OLE contains approximately up to 70% PMD (a mixture of the cis and trans isomers of p-menthane-3,8-diol). OLE has been notified under the European Biocidal Products Directive (BPD) 98/8/EC (now BPR Regulation (EU) No. 528/212) under its generic name "PMD rich botanic oil" and is currently proceeding through the registration process with the Health and Safety Executive in the UK.  It is also registered with Canada's Pest Management Regulatory Agency under the generic name "PMD and related oil of lemon eucalyptus compounds".

PMD can be synthesized by a Prins reaction of citronellal. This 2011 study also shows that C. citriodora oil contains only 1–2% PMD and is therefore different from OLE as registered with the U.S. EPA which has up to 70% PMD. A 2006 study showed that PMD is as effective as DEET when used in like quantities.

References

Insect repellents
Monoterpenes
Diols
Cyclohexanols
Isopropyl compounds